Beata Mazurek, née Cieluch (born 19 October 1967 in Ostrów Mazowiecka) is a Polish politician. She was elected to the Sejm on 25 September 2005, getting 7,012 votes in 7 Chełm district as a candidate from the Law and Justice list. After Law and Justice won the parliamentary election in 2015 she became a spokeswoman in December 2015.

See also
Politics of Poland

External links
Beata Mazurek - parliamentary page - includes declarations of interest, voting record, and transcripts of speeches.

1967 births
Living people
People from Ostrów Mazowiecka
Law and Justice politicians
Deputy Marshals of the Sejm of the Third Polish Republic
Members of the Polish Sejm 2005–2007
Members of the Polish Sejm 2007–2011
Members of the Polish Sejm 2011–2015
Members of the Polish Sejm 2015–2019
Women members of the Sejm of the Republic of Poland
MEPs for Poland 2019–2024
Women MEPs for Poland
John Paul II Catholic University of Lublin alumni
Recipients of the Order of Merit of the Republic of Hungary